Ningguo railway station is a railway station in Ningguo, Xuancheng, Anhui, China. It is an intermediate stop on the Anhui–Jiangxi railway.

History
The railway station opened in April 1974.

References

Railway stations in Anhui
Railway stations in China opened in 1974